The 2013–14 National First Division was played from September 2013 until May 2014, and is the second tier of South Africa's professional football. Chippa United won the league, earning promotion to the 2014–15 Premier Soccer League. Black Leopards and Milano United finished second and third, thus qualifying for the promotion/relegation play-offs against Polokwane City, which had finished 15th in the PSL. Polokwane City won the play-off, retaining the PSL place. Roses United and Blackburn Rovers were relegated to the ABC Motsepe League following their 15th and 16th-place finishes.

League table

References

External links
PSL.co.za

National First Division seasons
South
2013–14 in South African soccer leagues